Khayerpur is one of the 60 Legislative Assembly constituencies of Tripura state in India. It is in West Tripura district and a part of Tripura West (Lok Sabha constituency).

Members of Legislative Assembly 
 1977: Akhil Debnath, Communist Party of India (Marxist)
 1983: Sudhir Ranjan Mazumder, Indian National Congress
 1988: Ratan Lal Ghosh, Indian National Congress
 1993: Pabitra Kar, Communist Party of India (Marxist)
 1998: Pabitra Kar, Communist Party of India (Marxist)
 2003: Pabitra Kar, Communist Party of India (Marxist)
 2008: Pabitra Kar, Communist Party of India (Marxist)
 2013: Pabitra Kar, Communist Party of India (Marxist)

Election results

2018

2013 election

See also
List of constituencies of the Tripura Legislative Assembly
West Tripura district

References

West Tripura district
Assembly constituencies of Tripura